"Sailaway" is a song by the American R&B band Earth, Wind & Fire, written by Maurice White, Eddie del Barrio, Philip Bailey and Roxanne Seeman.  It was produced by White and recorded during the Faces sessions in Montserrat at George Martin's Air Studios and in Los Angeles at The Complex/ARC Studios 1980, engineered and mixed by George Massenburg. 

"Sailaway" was released on a vinyl, 12', radio promo disc with four songs by ARC and Columbia Records.

The song was included in Earth, Wind & Fire compilation albums including "The Love Songs", released in 1991 in Europe, UK, Germany and Brazil and "Simply the Best", released May 15, 2000 by Columbia.

In June 1999, Philip Bailey featured a jazz version of "Sailaway" under the title "Sail Away" on his Dreams album.

Track listing

Production
The rhythm track for Sailaway was recorded at George Martin's Air Montserrat studios. Vocals, horns, strings and overdubs were recorded at The Complex, designed by George Massenburg with custom-built equipment and board for Maurice White's ARC facility in Los Angeles.

Horns and strings were arranged by Eric Bulling. The recording includes a trombone solo performed by Louis Satterfield. 

The song was recorded and mixed by George Massenberg and Ken Fowler. It was mastered by Michael Reese.

Critical reception 
HiFi Stereo Review's album review of Faces praised the song, writing "especially fine items among the fifteen selections on these four sides include Sailaway, a rhapsodically beautiful little tidbit".

Apple Music described the Faces albums as being "smartly tempered by soulful breathers like...the delicate orchestral fantasy "Sailaway".

Philip Bailey solo version
Philip Bailey recorded a solo version of "Sailaway", appearing as "Sail Away", on his album Dreams, released June 22, 1999 on Heads Up International Records. The track was produced by Erik Huber.

Composition and lyrics
This song is a waltz in ¾ time and recorded in the key of G Major.

For the Faces album, White and Bailey invited lyricists from outside of the band to collaborate with them "to polish our songs and take them to the next level." In the liner notes written by Christian John Wikane for the 2010 UK reissue of "Faces" released by Big Break Records, Wikane quoted Roxanne Seeman recounting:

“Philip called me one day and said, Do you want to write a song for The Fire?...I went over to his place. They had cut a beautiful rhythm track that Maurice had written with Eddie del Barrio. Philip gave it to me. We did some of it together. I went home, did some more of it, came back, and then we did more of it together.”

References

External links

1980 songs
Earth, Wind & Fire songs
Songs written by Maurice White
Songs written by Philip Bailey
Songs written by Roxanne Seeman
Songs written by Eddie del Barrio
Song recordings produced by Maurice White
Waltzes